Chaima is a feminine given name of Arabic origin. Notable people with the name include:

Chaima Doublai (born 1996), Moroccan singer known professionally as Chaimae Abdelaziz
Chaima Ghobji (born 1994), Tunisian volleyball player
Chaima Jouini (born 1996), Tunisian handball player
Chaima Rahmouni (born 2001), Tunisian weightlifter
Chaima Trabelsi (born 1982), Tunisian racewalker

See also
Cumanagoto language, also known as Chaima
Shayma

Arabic feminine given names